The 1999–2000 Calgary Flames season was the 20th National Hockey League season in Calgary.  It featured a very young line-up, as befitted the "Young Guns" slogan the team was using at the time.  Twenty-nine-year-old Steve Dubinsky was the oldest forward on the team when the season started.  The Flames were pitting their hopes for ending their playoff drought on the off-season acquisition of 37-year-old goaltender Grant Fuhr.

The season started with young sniper Jarome Iginla holding out, as he was unable to come to a contract agreement with General Manager Al Coates.  Despite lacking a contract, Iginla attended training camp, however he missed the first two games of the season before a deal could be reached.

The Flames youth led to an inconsistent team, often bouncing between long winning and losing streaks.  It took the Flames 20 games to win their first game in regulation time, however the team would break an NHL record on January 21, 2000 by winning their eighth overtime game. At the end of the season the Flames set an NHL record by winning ten games in overtime.  The Flames also struggled with injuries all season, losing 479 man-games to injury, and using a total of 45 players over the course of 1999–2000. As a result, the Flames would finish last in the Northwest Division, missing the playoffs for the fourth straight year.

Following the season, the Flames cleaned house, firing Coates, and announcing they would not be offering head coach Brian Sutter and assistant coach Rich Preston new contracts.

On the bright side for the Flames, two players were selected to participate in the 2000 NHL All Star Game, as Phil Housley represented the North American team, while Valeri Bure represented the European team.

Rookie defenceman Robyn Regehr became the youngest nominee for the Bill Masterton Memorial Trophy in NHL history after he survived a serious car accident over the summer of 1999 that left him with two broken legs. Regehr would play 57 games for the Flames, but would not win the award.

Prior to the season, the Flames lost right winger Ed Ward to the Atlanta Thrashers in the 1999 NHL Expansion Draft.  The Flames also dealt Andreas Karlsson to the Thrashers in exchange for promises not to select certain unprotected players.

Regular season

Season standings

Schedule and results

Player statistics

Skaters
Note: GP = Games played; G = Goals; A = Assists; Pts = Points; PIM = Penalty minutes

†Denotes player spent time with another team before joining Calgary.  Stats reflect time with the Flames only.

Goaltenders
Note: GP = Games played; Min = Minutes played; W = Wins; L = Losses; T = Ties; GA = Goals against; SO = Shutouts; GAA = Goals against average

Transactions
The Flames were involved in the following transactions during the 1999–2000 season.

Trades

Free agents

Draft picks

Calgary's picks at the 1999 NHL Entry Draft, held in Boston, Massachusetts. The Flames had the 9th overall pick, however they traded down two spots to get Marc Savard from the New York Rangers.  With the 11th overall pick, the Flames drafted Oleg Saprykin.

Statistics are updated to the end of the 2014–15 NHL season. † denotes player was on an NHL roster in 2014–15.

Farm teams

Saint John Flames
The Baby Flames finished the 1999–2000 season with a .500 record at 32–32–11–5, good enough for 2nd place in the Atlantic Division.  They would be swept in the first round of the playoffs by the Lowell Lock Monsters three games to none, however. Daniel Tkaczuk and Benoit Gratton led the team in points with 66 each, while Rico Fata led in goals with 29. Ten different goaltenders suited up for the Flames, led by Jean-Sebastien Giguere, who started 44 games.

See also
1999–2000 NHL season

References

Player stats: 2006–07 Calgary Flames Media Guide, pg 112
Game log: 2006–07 Calgary Flames Media Guide, pg 135
Team standings: 1999–2000 NHL standings @hockeydb.com
Trades: hockeydb.com player pages

Calgary Flames seasons
Calgary
Calg